Rubus mollior is an uncommon North American species of brambles in the rose family. It grows in the central United States (Missouri, Oklahoma, Arkansas, Kansas).

The genetics of Rubus is extremely complex, so that it is difficult to decide on which groups should be recognized as species. There are many rare species with limited ranges such as this. Further study is suggested to clarify the taxonomy.

References

External links
Photo of herbarium specimen at Missouri Botanical Garden, collected in Missouri in 1989

mollior
Plants described in 1945
Flora of the United States